Michael ("Mike") Puckerin (born May 16, 1958, on Trinidad) is a retired athlete from Trinidad and Tobago who specialized in the 400 metres and 4 x 400 metres relay.

Achievements

External links
Best of Trinidad

1958 births
Living people
Trinidad and Tobago male sprinters
Athletes (track and field) at the 1983 Pan American Games
Pan American Games competitors for Trinidad and Tobago
Athletes (track and field) at the 1984 Summer Olympics
Olympic athletes of Trinidad and Tobago
Central American and Caribbean Games bronze medalists for Trinidad and Tobago
Competitors at the 1982 Central American and Caribbean Games
Central American and Caribbean Games medalists in athletics